The canton of Val de Lorraine Sud is an administrative division of the Meurthe-et-Moselle department, northeastern France. It was created at the French canton reorganisation which came into effect in March 2015. Its seat is in Maxéville.

It consists of the following communes:
Champigneulles
Frouard
Marbache
Maxéville
Pompey

References

Cantons of Meurthe-et-Moselle